ADNA or Adna may refer to:

Adna (given name)
A-DNA
Adna, Washington
Al-Tagr al-Adna, the Arabic name for the Lower March of Al-Andalus
aDNA, ancient DNA
Athletic DNA, apparel company
Alternate spelling of Saint Ada
Adna (crustacean), a genus of barnacles

See also
Arna, Norway, pronounced Ådna